Rhiconich is a remote hamlet, located at the head of Loch Inchard, in Sutherland, Scottish Highlands in the Scottish council area of Highland. The B801 at Richonich links the village of Kinlochbervie and associated crofting townships such as Oldshoremore to the A838.

Populated places in Sutherland